Brandon Spencer Lee Call (born November 17, 1976) is an American former television and film actor as a child and adolescent. He played Hobie Buchannon in the first year of Baywatch.

Personal life
Call was born on November 17, 1976, in Torrance, California. He is the youngest of four children born to Richard and Elyse Call.

He is married and raising his stepdaughter. Call already has one daughter from a previous relationship. She was born in 1998.

Career
While still in childhood, Call began acting in 1984. His first roles were guest spots on Simon & Simon and Hotel. His film debut was voicing "Fairy #1" in Disney's The Black Cauldron in 1985.  Also in 1985, he landed a recurring role on the NBC daytime drama, Santa Barbara. During his stint on Santa Barbara, he earned two Young Artist Awards for the role. After leaving the series in 1987, he guest-starred on two episodes of St. Elsewhere; he also co-starred with fellow soap opera veteran Christopher Rich on the short-lived series The Charmings. In 1989, Call was cast as Hobie Buchannon for the maiden season of NBC's Baywatch, which passed into syndication the following year. Call left the show to concentrate on his studies.

In 1990, Call returned to films with Blind Fury, in which he co-starred opposite Rutger Hauer. A year later, Call starred with Andrew Dice Clay in The Adventures of Ford Fairlane; he also appeared in For the Boys starring Bette Midler.

Before the close of 1991, Call was cast as John Thomas "J.T." Lambert on the ABC sitcom Step by Step, which moved to CBS in 1997 for its final season, after which Call retired from acting.

Shooting
After taping an episode of Step by Step on September 3, 1996, Call got into a traffic dispute while driving home. He was shot in both arms by Tommy Eugene Lewis. Call was treated at the UCLA Medical Center and made a full recovery.

Filmography

Film
 1985: The Black Cauldron – Fairfolk (Voice)
 1985: Jagged Edge – David Barnes
 1989: Blind Fury – Billy Devereaux
 1989: Warlock – Unbaptized Young boy
 1990: The Adventures of Ford Fairlane – The Kid
 1991: For the Boys – Danny Leonard (at 12), New York

Television
 1984: Simon & Simon – Addie Becker's Son (1 episode)
 1984: Hotel – Timmie (1 episode)
 1985: Slickers (Television movie) – Scooter Clinton
 1985: I Dream of Jeannie... Fifteen Years Later (Television movie) – Tony, Jr. (Age 7)
 1985–1987: Santa Barbara – Brandon Capwell
 1985–1988: Magnum, P.I. – Billy, Karen's son (3 episodes)
 1986: The Richest Cat in the World (Television movie) – Bart
 1986: Life with Lucy – Max (2 episodes)
 1987–1989: St. Elsewhere – Christopher McFadden (2 episodes)
 1987: Webster – Ricky (1 episode)
 1987: Trying Times – Reggie (1 episode)
 1987–1988: The Charmings – Thomas Charming (19 episodes)
 1988: Something Is Out There – Joey (2 episodes)
 1989: The Gifted One (Television movie) – Michael (age 10)
 1989–1990: Baywatch – Hobie Buchannon (22 episodes)
 1991–1998: Step by Step – John Thomas "J.T." Lambert
 1994: Thunder in Paradise – Zach (2 episodes)

Awards and nominations

References

External links
 
 

1976 births
American male child actors
American victims of crime
American male film actors
American male television actors
American shooting survivors
Living people
Actors from Torrance, California
20th-century American male actors